Der Bergdoktor may refer to:

 Der Bergdoktor (1992 TV series)
 Der Bergdoktor (2008 TV series)